The 15-meter band (also called the 21-MHz band or 15 meters) is an amateur radio frequency band spanning the shortwave spectrum from 21 to 21.45 MHz. The band is suitable for amateur long-distance communications, and such use is permitted in nearly all countries.

Because 15-meter waves propagate primarily via reflection off of the F-2 layer of the ionosphere, the band is most useful for intercontinental communication during daylight hours, especially in years close to solar maxima, but the band permits long-distance without high-power station equipment outside such ideal windows. The 15-meter wavelength is harmonically related to that of the 40-meter band, so it is often possible to use an antenna designed for 40 meters.

History
The 15-meter band was designated by the 1947 International Radio Conference of Atlantic City in part to compensate for the loss of the 160-meter band to amateurs by the introduction of LORAN during World War II.  The 15-meter band opened to amateurs for CW operation only in the United States on May 1, 1952, and telephony operations were authorized above 21.25 MHz and Novice CW operations between 21.100 and 21.250 MHz on March 28, 1953.

Frequency allocation

United States

Key

Canada
Canada is part of region 2 and as such is subject to the IARU band plan.  Radio Amateurs of Canada offers the bandplan below as a recommendation for use by radio amateurs in that country but it does not have the force of law and should only be considered a suggestion or guideline.

Key

See also
Shortwave bands

References

 Click the 15 Meter button at the bottom of the page

Amateur radio bands